Ypsolopha melanofuscella is a moth of the family Ypsolophidae. It is found in the Russian Far East.

The wingspan is 16.5–17.3 mm. The forewings are dark brown with a violet lustre and with weakly visible transverse striation. The hindwings are dark brownish grey, but paler towards the base.

Etymology
The specific name is derived from two Latin roots melano- and fusc- (collectively meaning dark brown) and refers to the forewing coloration of the species.

References

Moths described in 2013
Ypsolophidae
Moths of Asia